Nabadwip Vidyasagar College (Bengali: নবদ্বীপ বিদ্যাসাগর কলেজ) is a college situated in Nabadwip in Nadia, West Bengal, India. It was established in 1942 as a branch of Vidyasagar College, kolkata and was affiliated to the University of Calcutta, later in 1960 the University of Kalyani, was established and this college became affiliated with it. This college is one of the few colleges under University of Kalyani which offers undergraduate courses in arts, commerce and sciences.

History 
The college began 5 March 1942 as a branch of Vidyasagar College in Kolkata. It was initially organised in the Nabadwip Hindu School building. From 1942 to 1948 it functioned as a branch of Kolkata Vidyasagar College. Afterwards local educationists and common people of Nabadwip town formed a committee to look after the administration of the college.

Departments

Commerce
 Accountancy

Science 
 Chemistry
 Physics
 Computer science
 Zoology
 Botany
 Mathematics
 Environmental science

Arts
 Bengali
 Sanskrit
 History
 Geography
 Political Science
 Education
 Philosophy
 Economics
 Physical Education

Accreditation
The college was awarded B grade by the National Assessment and Accreditation Council. The college is recognized by the University Grants Commission.

See also

References

External links
Nabadwip Vidyasagar College
University of Kalyani
University Grants Commission
National Assessment and Accreditation Council

Universities and colleges in Nadia district
Colleges affiliated to University of Kalyani
Educational institutions established in 1942
1942 establishments in India